The Municipality of Maldonado is one of the eight municipalities of Maldonado Department, Uruguay. It was created by Law N° 18653 of 15 March 2010.

Location 
The municipality is located at the south area of the department, and it has a total area of 192 km² (a 4.01% of the department area) and a population of around 105000 inhabitants (55.12% of the department population).

Limits 
According to the Decree of the Departmental Board of Maldonado N° 3862 of 11 February 2010, the territorial jurisdiction of the municipality was established as follows:

Settlements 
The following populated places are part of this municipality: 
 Abra de Perdomo
 Barrio Hipódromo
 Canteras de Marelli
 Cerro Pelado
 Chihuahua
 Laguna del Diario
 Laguna del Sauce
 Las Cumbres
 Los Ceibos
 Los Corchos
 Maldonado
 Pinares-Las Delicias
 Portezuelo
 Punta Ballena

Constituencies 
According to the Decree of the Departmental Board of Maldonado N° 3909 of 2 December 2004, the following electoral series and constituencies were ordered:
 DAA: Centro
 DAC: Los Ceibos
 DAD: Punta Ballena
 DAE: Pinares
 DAF: Cerro Pelado
 DAG: Hipódromo
 DAH: Maldonado Nuevo
 DAI: El Jagüel
 DAJ: Las Delicias

Authorities 
The authority of the municipality is the Municipal Council, integrated by the Mayor (who presides it) and four Councilors.

References 

Maldonado